South West Africa had banknotes issued at various times between 1916 and 1959 while under South African administration. The issues of 1916-18 are denominated in South West African marks. The later issues are denominated in South West African pounds.

List of issuers of South West African mark-denominated notes

Sonja Scholz, Windhoek.
Gibeon Savings and Loans Association, Gibeon.
Speisser and Silla, Windhoek.
South West African Land Credit Association, Luderitz.
Swakopmund Co-operative Bank, Swakopmund
Swakopmund Bookshop, Swakopmund and Windhoek.
Viktoria Pharmacy, Windhoek.
Wecke and Voigts, Karabib, Okahandja, Swakopmund, and Windhoek.

List of issuers of South West African pound-denominated notes

Barclays Bank (Dominion, Colonial and Overseas)
Standard Bank of South Africa Limited
Volkskas Limited

See also

Commonwealth banknote-issuing institutions

Banknotes of Africa
Currencies of Namibia